Arthur Howard Potts  (born ) is a former politician in Ontario, Canada. He was a Liberal member of the Legislative Assembly of Ontario from 2014 to 2018 who represented the riding of Beaches—East York. He announced that he was running for the Ontario Liberal Party leadership in October 2019, but bowed out days later.

Background
Potts attended the University of Toronto and graduated with a bachelor's degree in political philosophy. He then obtained a master's degree in industrial relations from Queen's University. He worked as a lobbyist in the city of Toronto and at the provincial level; and gained some notoriety by buying dinner with the mayor at an auction. Among his clients was the Open Shop Contractors Association of Ontario, an organization that sought to open up tendering to all qualified contractors, regardless of their union affiliation.  Potts was a registered lobbyist for the Open Shop Contractors Association, following the merger of the Toronto Independent Contractors Association, which he founded, with OSCA. He also represented The Beer Store, assisting them in convincing the Ontario government to implement a deposit/return system on LCBO containers, as well as firms in the film, recycling and construction industries,  During this time he also served as President of BioWaste Treatment Technologies, which owned the Ontario rights to an Israeli-based anaerobic digestion technology that can divert upwards of 75% of mixed municipal waste from landfill, while creating clean water, energy and compost. He also co-founded Woodwaste Solutions, a firm specializing in waste wood reuse and recycling. He lives in Toronto, Ontario with his partner Lisa Martin, who has three children, while he has two daughters of his own, Robin and Dara.

Politics
In the 1994 municipal election he ran for councillor on Toronto City Council in Ward 8 (Riverdale) but lost to incumbent Peter Tabuns. In the 2014 Ontario election, he was elected in the riding of Beaches—East York in a tight race, beating incumbent New Democrat Michael Prue by 431 votes.

In July 2014, he was appointed as Parliamentary Assistant  (PA) to the Minister of Agriculture, Food and Rural Affairs. Subsequently, he served as Parliamentary Assistant for the Minister of Environment and Climate Change.

In September 2016, Potts introduced a private member's bill called "Protecting Rewards Points Act" that would prevent loyalty points from expiring. Earlier in the year, Air Miles Canada announced that points collected but not used that were older than five years would expire. Potts introduced his bill to prevent this from happening. The bill was passed with unanimous approval in December 2016. Faced with the impending legislation, Air Miles announced that they would reverse their earlier decision. However the legislation still passed to prevent Air Miles and other loyalty point schemes from doing so in the future.

Potts was defeated in the 2018 Ontario election.

Election results

References

External links

1957 births
21st-century Canadian politicians
Living people
Ontario Liberal Party MPPs
Politicians from Toronto
Queen's University at Kingston alumni
University of Toronto alumni